Kraljevo may refer to:
 Kraljevo, a city in the Raška District, Serbia
 Kraljevo (Aleksinac), a village in the Aleksinac Municipality, Nišava District, Serbia

 Kraljevo Polje, a village in the Han Pijesak Municipality, Republika Srpska, Bosnia and Herzegovina
 , a village in the Bosiljevo Municipality, Karlovac County, Croatia

 , a Yugoslav film from 1981

See also
 Kralevo (disambiguation)